Anansi is a genus of African pirate spiders first described by L. R. Benavides, G. Giribet & Gustavo Hormiga in 2017. It is named after Anansi, a trickster god of Akan folklore.  it contains only three species.

References

Araneomorphae genera
Mimetidae